Quame Holder (born April 14, 1988 in Port of Spain) is a Trinidadian footballer who is currently without a club.

Career

Amateur
Holder moved from his native Trinidad to the United States aged 13, settling in New York. He attended New Rochelle High School, and played for the nationally ranked youth club New Rochelle Storm Raiders, but decided against a college soccer career, signing instead with the youth academy of Major League Soccer's New York Red Bulls in 2009. He played with the New York Red Bull NPSL team in the National Premier Soccer League in 2010.

Professional
Holder signed his first professional contract in 2011 when he was signed by F.C. New York of the USL Professional Division. He made his professional debut on April 30, 2011 in a 2-1 loss to Orlando City, and scored his first professional goal on May 30 in a 2-1 win over the Rochester Rhinos.

References

1988 births
Living people
Sportspeople from New Rochelle, New York
Trinidad and Tobago footballers
F.C. New York players
USL Championship players
Association football midfielders